Willy Geertje van Ammelrooij (born 5 April 1944), known as Willeke van Ammelrooy, is a Dutch actress and director.

Life and career 

Willeke van Ammelrooy was born in Amsterdam, Netherlands. She attended drama school in Amsterdam.

Van Ammelrooy has acted on stage as well as in films. She participated in 27 movies. Her first film was Mira in 1971.

Success with Antonia's Line 
She later starred in the award-winning feminist film Antonia's Line, which tells the story of an independent woman who, after returning to the anonymous Dutch village of her birth, establishes and nurtures a close-knit matriarchal community.

She received positive reviews and the Golden Calf for Best Actress for her performance and the film enjoyed critical success, including the Academy Award for Best Foreign Language Film at the 68th Academy Awards. Emanuel Levy, writing for The Advocate, wrote "It's easy to see why" the film was winning awards in festivals, calling it "an enchanting fairy tale that maintains a consistently warm, lighthearted feel," and Willeke van Ammelrooy wonderful. Janet Maslin of The New York Times called it "a work of magical feminism." The film also screened at the Toronto International Film Festival, where it won the People's Choice Award.

According to Box Office Mojo, the film completed its run grossing $4,228,275 in North America, 1,660,901 admissions in the European Union, and $21,046 in South Korea.

Other work 
In 2017, van Ammelrooy was announced as a member of the film jury for ShortCutz Amsterdam, an annual film festival promoting short films in Amsterdam.

Personal life 

Van Ammelrooy is married to the Dutch opera singer Marco Bakker.

Filmography

Film 

Mira (1971) - Mira
Louisa, een woord van liefde (1972) - Louisa
The Burglar (1972) - Fanny
The Killer Is on the Phone (1972) - Dorothy

Frank en Eva (1973)
Dakota (1974)
Help! The Doctor Is Drowning (1974)
Alicia (1974)
O.Q Corral (1975)
Mijn nachten met Susan, Olga, Julie, Piet en Sandra (1975)
L'amour au trousses (1975)
Het Jaar van de Kreeft (1975)
L'arrière train sifflera trois fois (1975)
La Donneuse (1975)
Wan Pipel (1976)
De Mantel der Liefde (1978)
Grijpstra & De Gier (1979)
Een vlucht regenwulpen (1981)
On Top of the Whale (1982)
De Lift (1983)
Herenstraat 10 (1983)
Ciske de Rat (1984)
Andre Handles Them All (1985)
Op hoop van zegen (1986)
Koko Flanel (1990)
Alleen maar vrienden (1992)
Antonia's Line (1995) (Oscar for best foreign movie)
Lijmen/Het Been (2001)
De Schippers van de Kameleon (2003)
 (2004)
The Lake House (2006)
Bride Flight (2008)
The Hell of '63 (2009)
Bride Flight (2011)
Life Is Wonderful (2018)

Television 
Het Glazen Huis (2004–2005)

References

External links 

 
 

1944 births
Living people
Dutch expatriates in the United States
Dutch film actresses
Dutch television actresses
Actresses from Amsterdam
Golden Calf winners
20th-century Dutch actresses
21st-century Dutch actresses